The Navy Street station was a station on the demolished BMT Myrtle Avenue Line in Brooklyn, New York City. It had 2 tracks and 1 island platform. The station was originally built on April 10, 1888 for the Myrtle Avenue Elevated trains, but also served Lexington Avenue Elevated trains by 1891. A segment of the Lexington Avenue Line once turned north from here onto Hudson Avenue and York Street on its way to the Fulton Ferry until 1904, when Lexington and Fifth Avenue trains were redirected along Myrtle Avenue west of this station. It closed on October 4, 1969, after a fire on the elevated structure. The next stop to the north was Vanderbilt Avenue. The next stop to the south was Bridge–Jay Streets.

References

Last Days of the Myrtle Avenue El (Forgotten New York.com)
Park Ave El; 1885-1891 (The Joe KorNer)

Defunct BMT Myrtle Avenue Line stations
Railway stations in the United States opened in 1888
Railway stations closed in 1969
1888 establishments in New York (state)
1969 disestablishments in New York (state)
Former elevated and subway stations in Brooklyn